The deputy secretary of state of the United States is the principal deputy to the secretary of state. The current deputy secretary of state is Wendy Ruth Sherman, serving since April 2021 under secretary of state Antony Blinken. If the secretary of state resigns or dies, the deputy secretary of state becomes acting secretary of state until the president nominates and the Senate confirms a replacement. The position was created in 1972. Prior to July 13, 1972, the under secretary of state had been the second ranking officer of the Department of State. The position is currently held by Wendy Sherman.

The State Department is the only federal cabinet-level agency to have two co-equal deputy secretaries. The second deputy secretary of state, the deputy secretary of state for management and resources, serves as the "first assistant" for the purposes of the Vacancies Reform Act, but both deputy secretaries have full delegated authority to act for the secretary, if not otherwise prohibited by law.

Certain deputy secretaries of state went on to become appointed as the secretary of state, such as Lawrence Eagleburger in 1992, Warren Christopher in 1993, and Antony Blinken in 2021.

List of deputy secretaries of state

References

External links 
 

United States Department of State

State
1972 introductions
United States diplomacy